Varoi Igo Morea (born 27 November 1986) is a Papua New Guinean woman cricketer. Varoi made her international debut at the 2015 ICC Women's World Twenty20 Qualifier and also represented Papua New Guinea in the 2015 Pacific Games.

References

External links 

1986 births
Living people
Papua New Guinean women cricketers
People from the National Capital District (Papua New Guinea)